Paweł Rybak (born 8 January 1967) is a Polish former football manager and former player, who played as a defender.

Career
He started his career with LZS Wola Rzeczycka. In 1986 he joined Stal Stalowa Wola, for which he played 87 games and scored 4 goals in the top division. In February 2004, the Polish club announced that they had parted ways with Rybak. After leaving Stal, he represented Sokół Nisko.

He managed LZS Turbia and OKS Mokrzyszów.

References

External links
 

1967 births
Living people
People from Stalowa Wola
Polish footballers
Association football defenders
Sokół Nisko players
Stal Stalowa Wola players
Ekstraklasa players
Polish football managers